Bathycongrus macrocercus is an eel in the family Congridae (conger/garden eels). It was described by Alfred William Alcock in 1894, originally under the genus Congromuraena. It is a marine, deep water-dwelling eel which is known from the Andaman Islands, in the eastern Indian Ocean.

References

macrocercus
Fish described in 1894